The Calvados Chain are a group of islands in the Solomon Sea, belonging to Papua New Guinea within the Louisiade Archipelago.

Geography
The group extends from Pana Varavara in the west to the small island of Nigaho in the east over a distance of 88 km. 
The easternmost island of Nigaho is where the chain of islands end. Pana Tinani is separated from the group by the isolated Magamaga Channel. 
The islands rise up to 302 meters (Motorina) steeply from the sea and are either wooded or overgrown with grass. Many islands are surrounded by their own reefs and small lagoons. Apart from the high islands, there are numerous low coral islands and reefs.
The eastern edge of the chain lies to the northwest of Vanatinai (formerly Sudest) Island.

Population
Twelve of the islands are inhabited, with a total of 3276 residents as of 2014.
The islanders speak the Misima-Paneati Language.

Islands
Primary islands in the chain:

References

Archipelagoes of Papua New Guinea
.
.C
Lists of islands of Papua New Guinea
Geography of Milne Bay Province